The 30 kilometre cross-country skiing event was part of the cross-country skiing programme at the 1960 Winter Olympics, in Squaw Valley, California, United States. It was the second appearance of the event at its length of 30 km. The competition was held on Saturday, February 19, 1960 at the McKinney Creek Stadium.

Sixten Jernberg of Sweden won the gold medal ahead of fellow Swede Rolf Rämgård. Defending Olympic champion Veikko Hakulinen from Finland finished 6th. Three of the 48 competitors did not finish

Results

References

External links
1960 Squaw Valley Official Olympic Report

Men's cross-country skiing at the 1960 Winter Olympics
Men's 30 kilometre cross-country skiing at the Winter Olympics